Hirotomo (written: 礼朝 or 弘友) is a masculine Japanese given name. Notable people with the name include:

, Japanese daimyō
, Japanese politician

Japanese masculine given names